Jehu Grant ( 1752 – December 28, 1840) was born a slave in Rhode Island. He was living in Narragansett, in 1777, when he ran away from his master and served in various capacities in the Continental Army for eight months during the American Revolutionary War. His situation was discovered and he was returned to his master, who later sold him to a man named Grant. With the assistance of Joshua Swann, his freedom was purchased from that master and in return he agreed to work for Swann for a certain time.

Joshua Swann took up residence in Milton, Saratoga County, New York, and brought along Jehu Grant. After the agreed term had expired, Jehu Grant continued to live in Saratoga County. He married and had several children: he is listed in the 1820 Federal Census of the Town of Milton with a household consisting of two males under 14, one male 14 to 26 and one over 45, and with a female 14 to 26 and one over 45.

In 1832, the United States Congress enacted the first comprehensive Pension Act, which granted an annual stipend to any veteran of the Revolutionary War who could prove his service. Jehu Grant was one of several dozen black veterans, and one of thousands in total, who applied for the fund. The only proof many of these veterans had that they had been part of the fight were their own recollections. To receive the funds, ex-soldiers had to tell their stories to a local court reporter, who sent the records on to Washington for disposition.

At the time of his pension application, Grant was 80 years old and blind. He made the appeal with the assistance of a neighbor.

The following is an excerpt from the letter he sent to J. L. Edward, the then Commissioner of Pensions:

Grant's application was denied, as was a subsequent plea. Because he was employed as a waggoner and waiter, and not as a proper soldier, the U.S. government in 1832 would not recognize his claim.

External links
 Jehu Grant on the Saratoga County NYGenWeb Page
 
 The Official record of his rejection was because he served only as a Waiter and A Wagon-master

1752 births
1840 deaths
People from Narragansett, Rhode Island
People from Milton, Saratoga County, New York
African Americans in the American Revolution
18th-century American slaves
People of Rhode Island in the American Revolution